Daniel Meyer (born ) is a Swiss wheelchair curler.

He participated in the 2010 Winter Paralympics where Swiss team finished on seventh place.

Teams

References

External links 

Profile at the Official Website for the 2010 Winter Paralympics in Vancouver

Living people
1955 births
Swiss male curlers
Swiss wheelchair curlers
Paralympic wheelchair curlers of Switzerland
Wheelchair curlers at the 2010 Winter Paralympics
Swiss wheelchair curling champions